Clarita Villarba Rivera, better known by her screen name Mila del Sol (12 May 1923 – 10 November 2020), was a Filipina actress, entrepreneur and philanthropist. Born in Tondo, Manila, she gained fame in her very first lead role in the 1939 film Giliw Ko. She was discovered by LVN Pictures President Doña Sisang de Leon, who insisted in casting her over the objections of the film's director, who felt she was too young for the part. It was the film's director, Carlos Vander Tolosa, who gave her the screen name Mila del Sol for "causing the sun (sol) to appear as if by miracle (milagro) over his otherwise overcast set whenever she was called in to do her scenes."

Film production shut down during the Japanese occupation and was restored only in 1945. Del Sol returned to LVN and starred in its production of Manuel Conde's Orasang Ginto, the first post-war Filipino film. She starred in other LVN films of the 1940s, including Ibong Adarna (1949) and Villa Hermosa.

Del Sol retired from films to raise a family in the 1950s, but staged a comeback in 1960 with two films released that year, Pakipot and Tatlong Magdalena. The following year, she starred in an international production, Espionage Far East, and later starred in a long-running television series. She began her career as an entrepreneur in 1964, and focused on philanthropic work from the 1970s onward.

Pope Francis imparted the Apostolic Blessing upon del Sol on the occasion of her 90th birthday.

In December 2014, the Congress of the Philippines passed Resolution No. 165, honoring Mila del Sol “for her contributions to the movie industry and to Philippine society in general”. The Resolution said in part that “Ms. Mila del Sol proved that poverty should not be a hindrance but an inspiration to improve one's status in life” and that “her businesses and various foundations that employ and extend benefits to those who are in need and have less in life are proofs of Ms. Mila del Sol's unwavering commitment to contribute to the improvement of Philippine society."

Early life

Del Sol was born in Tondo, Manila at the Mary Johnston Hospital. Her father, Amado C. Rivera, worked at the internal revenue service during the day, and was a waiter at night. He served as a guerilla in the Philippines during World War II. Her mother, Lorenza Villarba, stayed at home to raise eight children.

Del Sol attended Malate Primary School, San Andres Elementary, and Intramuros Intermediate School. She could not go to high school, since she had to start working, at the age of 12. She later attended Hollywood High School in the 1950s, after the birth of her third child. She took some courses at Los Angeles City College and Ateneo de Manila University.

Career in Film & Television

1938–1942
Del Sol appeared in three films in 1938 (including Ang Maya opposite Fernando Poe, Sr.), but got her big break as a principal character in the 1939 classic Giliw Ko, for which she was honored by then Philippine President Manuel L. Quezon. This was the first movie of the storied film production company. She made twelve other films for LVN during this period, including Hali (1940), an early example of the Sarong genre, and Sawing Gantimpala (1940), which was based on a song written for del Sol by First Lady Aurora Quezon.

1946–1952
LVN stopped film production during World War II, when the Philippines was occupied by Japan. Del Sol volunteered for the Red Cross, and frequented Prisoner of War camps along with other "Blue Ladies" of the Philippine film industry. LVN's first post-war film, Orasang Ginto again starred del Sol. She made more than twenty other films during this period including Garrison 13 (1946), which recounted atrocities committed by the Imperial Japanese Army in the Philippines during the war.

1960 onwards
Del Sol migrated to the United States, and lived there and in Europe for much of the 1950s. She returned to the Philippines in the 1960s, when she made two more films, and starred in the hit television series Problema Mo Na Yan. She continued her work as an actress well into her 80s, most recently as a lead in the television series Rosalka.

Actors and directors
Del Sol acted opposite all the male leads of her period, including Teddy Benavídez, Fred Cortes, Armando Goyena, Fernando Poe, Sr., José Padilla, Jr., Ely Ramos, Jaime de la Rosa, Rogelio de la Rosa, and Leopoldo Salcedo. She was directed by Lamberto V. Avellana,  Emmanuel Borlaza, Manuel Conde, Ramon A. Estella, Gregorio Fernandes, Gerardo de León, José Nepomuceno, Vicente Salumbides, Manuel Silos, and Carlos Vander Tolosa.

Awards
 The Cinema's Living Treasure Citation, 1994, The Metropolitan Manila Authority and The Metro Manila Film Festival 
 Nagtatanging Gawad Urian, 2013, Manunuri ng Pelikulang Pilipino
 House Resolution No. 165 Honoring Clarita Villarba Rivera, Also Known As Mila Del Sol, For Her Contributions To The Movie Industry That Enriched The Philippine Culture, And To Philippine Society In General, 2014, Philippine Congress

Business and philanthropy
In 1964, del Sol founded Superior Maintenance Services, which has employed over 100,000 people, and continues to be managed by her grandchildren. Del Sol chaired the Pagasa ng Kabataan Foundation, which provides scholarships to indigent youth, and affordable housing to the elderly, and the Mila del Sol & Eddie Romero Fund for Community Development, which supports nonprofits and non-governmental organizations focused on local improvement. Del Sol has also been an active member or officer of several philanthropic organizations, including Lions Club, Mowelfund, the Philippine National Red Cross, and the Rotary Club.

Relationships
Del Sol is the mother of Filipina actress and television host Jeanne Young, non-profit professionals Ancel Edgar Romero and Leo John Romero, grandmother of famed musician  Ira Cruz, Philippine Congressman Gustavo Tambunting of Parañaque, actor Onemig Bondoc, and aunt of Former Mayor of Muntinlupa Ignacio Bunye.

Death
Mila died on November 10, 2020 in Parañaque, Philippines

Selected filmography

Film
1938 - Ang Maya
1938 - Hatol ng Mataas na Langit
1938 - Mariang Alimango (X'Otic)
1939 - Giliw Ko (LVN)
1940 - Hali (LVN)
1940 - Prinsesa ng Kumintang (LVN)
1940 - Sawing Gantimpala (LVN)
1940 - Maginoong Takas (LVN)
1940 - Nag-iisang Sangla (LVN)
1941 - Angelita (LVN)
1941 - Hiyas ng Dagat (LVN)
1941 - Rosalinda (LVN)
1941 - Villa Hermosa (LVN)
1941 - Ararong Ginto (LVN)
1941 - Ibong Adarna (LVN)
1942 - Caviteno (LVN)
1946 - Orasang Ginto (LVN)
1946 - Garrison 13 (LVN)
1946 - Alaala Kita (LVN)
1946 - Dalawang Daigdig (LVN)
1946 - Ang Prinsipeng Hindi Tumatawa (LVN)
1947 - Maling Akala (LVN)
1947 - Violeta (LVN)
1947 - Binatang Taring (LVN)
1947 - Sa Ngiti Mo Lamang (LVN)
1947 - Romansa (LVN)
1947 - Sarungbanggi (LVN)
1948 - Malaya (Mutya sa Gubat) (LVN)
1949 - Hiyas ng Pamilihan (LVN)
1949 - Kuba sa Quiapo (LVN)
1949 - Lupang Pangako (LVN)
1949 - Batalyong XIII (LVN)
1949 - Don Juan Teñoso (LVN)
1949 - Milyonaria (LVN)
1950 - Nuno sa Punso (LVN)
1950 - Dayang-Dayang (LVN)
1950 - In Despair (LVN)
1950 - Tatlong Limbas (FPP)
1951 - Reyna Elena (LVN)
1951 - Anak ng Pulubi (LVN)
1952 - Romansa sa Nayon (LVN)
1952 - Haring Solomon at Reyna Sheba (LVN)
1957 - Escapade in Japan
1960 - Pakipot
1960 - Tatlong Magdalena
1961 - Espionage: Far East
1962 - Santa Clarang Pinung-Pino
1969 - Young Girl
1974 - Batya't Palu-palo
1989 - Kahit Wala Ka Na

Television
Rawhide
Silent Service
Problema Mo Na Yan
Talagang Ganyan (with Leopoldo Salcedo, Dindo Fernando, and Jeanne Young)
Rosalka (2010)

Notes

References

External links

1923 births
2020 deaths
Actresses from Manila
Filipino child actresses
Filipino film actresses
Filipino television actresses
People from Tondo, Manila
Tagalog people
Filipino expatriates in the United States